Parlick (also known as Parlick Pike) is an approximately cone-shaped steep-sided hill at the extreme south of the main range of Bowland fells in Lancashire, England. Its bog-free sides make it more popular with walkers than the shallow boggy hills to its north. Paths zigzag up this hill from the south, or for the more strenuous ascent a straight path can be chosen. This hill is usually green — different from the often thorny brown to red of the northern hills. A thin neck joins Parlick onto Fair Snape Fell with well-worn paths linking the two.

Regarding the origin of the name, Professor Eilert Ekwall, in his 1922 The Place-names of Lancashire, writes:
".. (caput de) Pirloc 1228 C1R, Perlak 1228 WhC 371, Pireloke 1338 LPR, Pyrelok pyke c 1350 ib. The name cannot mean " pear  orchard " as Wyld suggests. But the etymology may be correct with a slight amendment. O.E. loc means " fold for sheep or goats." A sheep fold at which grew a peartree (O.E. pyrige) may very well have been at the foot of or on the slope of the hill ; this may have been called Parlick (Pirloc) and have given the hill its name. For a probable earlier name see under Core, p. 143."

Parlick is a popular venue for foot-launched gliders, because it produces good ridge lift in an unusually wide variety of wind directions. The extensive west-facing bowl allows paraglider pilots to fly to Fair Snape Fell and beyond without leaving reliable ridge lift and as far forwards as Beacon Fell. Local pilots use this arena for club competitions, such as the 'Parlick Grid Challenge'  

The summit consists of little more than a cairn, leaving the walker to look at the view, south to Preston and Winter Hill near Chorley, east toward Pendle Hill, and west towards Blackpool and the Irish Sea.

The boundary between the boroughs of Wyre and Ribble Valley passes very close to the summit, with half of the hill lying within each borough.

"Parlick Fell" is the name of a cheese made in Longridge from sheep's milk from the area.

The hill and its environs are the location of the legend of the enormous Dun Cow, which was reputed to wander freely across the moorland, and to be in the habit of quenching its thirst at "Nick's Water-Pot", a well on the summit of Parlick.

References

Hills of the Forest of Bowland
Mountains and hills of Lancashire
Geography of the Borough of Wyre
Geography of Ribble Valley